Francis Ducreux (14 February 1945 – 1 May 2021) was a French racing cyclist. He rode in the 1968 Tour de France and 1971 Tour de France.

References

External links
 

1945 births
2021 deaths
French male cyclists
Place of birth missing
Sportspeople from Eure
Cyclists from Normandy